Byar Branch is a water stream in the U.S. state of Missouri. It is a tributary of Bear Creek.

Byar Branch has the name of the local Byar family.

See also
List of rivers of Missouri

References

Rivers of Macon County, Missouri
Rivers of Shelby County, Missouri
Rivers of Missouri